The Bravery Council of Australia Meeting 81 Honours List was announced by the Governor General of Australia, Sir Peter Cosgrove, AK, MC, on 18 August 2014.

Awards were announced for 
the Star of Courage,
the Bravery Medal,
Commendation for Brave Conduct and
Group Bravery Citation.

† indicates an award given posthumously.

Star of Courage (SC)

 Michael Nerandzic, † New South Wales

Bravery Medal (BM)

 Shane James Allen, Australian Capital Territory
 Anthony Gavin Baker, † New South Wales
 Timothy Michael Bateman, Western Australia
 James Ronald Bodsworth, Australian Capital Territory
 Benjamin Luke Carroll, Queensland
 Trevor Mark Davis, Queensland
 Kasun Hasanga Fernando, Victoria
 Locke William Finch, Queensland
 Matthew Brian Holmes, Western Australia
 Kennedy Jones, † Northern Territory
 Troy Brian Jorgensen, New South Wales
 Amos John Mills, Queensland
 Colin Raymond O'Hare, Australian Capital Territory
 Ian Thomas Ryan, † New South Wales
 Michael James Ryan, Victoria
 Federal Agent Mathew Evan Seneviratne, Australian Federal Police
 Ruth Lynden Sheridan, Victoria
 Robert Allen Skewes, Queensland
 Scott Graham Smith, Queensland
 Jarrad Nathan Townley, New South Wales
 David Alan White, New South Wales
 Ishan Chathuranga Wickramathunga, Victoria

Commendation for Brave Conduct

 Angus Robert Anderson, Queensland
 Michael John Anderson, New South Wales
 Mary Maureen Barden, Victoria
 Damien Luke Berry, New South Wales
 Jacob Ryan Berry, New South Wales
 Senior Constable Damon Edward Bishop, Queensland Police
 Stephen Warwick Brandley, New South Wales
 James Angus Burge, New South Walew
 Rodney John Burnby, Western Australia
 Hassan Chahrouk, New South Wales
 Christopher James Curchill, Western Australia
 Kathleen Chchrane, New South Wales
 Constable Anne Christine Collis, Queensland Police
 Senior Constable Donald James Couper, Western Australia Police
 Stephanie Jayne Defina, Victoria
 Joshua Eason-Jones, Victoria
 Matthew Eason-Jones, Victoria
 Christopher John Fowler, Victoria
 Jake Robert Gunston, Queensland
 Homayon Hatami, Victoria
 Garry Scott Hayes, Queensland
 Anthony Thomas Haynes, United Kingdom
 Ryan Mark Higginbottom, Queensland
 David Micheal Holmes, Queensland
 Garry Colin Keir, New South Wales
 Tim James Martin, Queensland
 Madeleine Denise Matkowsky, Victoria
  Christopher Linh Nguyen, Victoria
 Leigh Parkes, New South Walre
 Senior Sergeant Michael James Pearson, Queensland Police
 Peter Christopher Perkins, New South Wales
 Sergeant Neil Andrew Prest, New South Wales Police
 Wayne Richard Pritchard, Victoria
 Senior Constable Michael Rasborsek, Queensland Police
 Sandra Riemer, Queensland
 Jade Jihan Safein, New South Wales
 Alex John Sainsbury, Queensland
 Robert Shane Scott, Queensland
 Senior Constable Amit Singh, Queensland Police
 Kylie Sheree Smith, Queensland
 James Mark Stirling, New South Wales
 Nathan Peter Wall, New South Wales
 Reynold Dwayne Williams, Western Australia
 Lareena May Woods, Western Australia

Group Bravery Citation
Awardees are several people who assisted in the rescue of residents during the floods in Warmun, Western Australia on 13 March 2011.
 Kathleen Susan Burnsby
 Rodney John Burnby
 Christopher James Churchill
 Mr Christopher Clarke †
 Senior Constable Donald James Couper, Western Australia Police
 Tanya Maree Couper
 Julie Ann Echo
 Cecil Peter Mosquito
 Leon Pinday

Awardees are several members of the Marysville Country Fire Authority who were involved in the Victorian bushfires on 7 February 2009.
 Glen Francis Fiske
 Kellan Frederick Fiske
 Patrick Joseph Flannagan
 Christopher Michael Gleeson 
 Michael John Gleeson
 Susan Irene Gleeson
 Travis Christopher Gleeson
 Christopher John Haden
 Mark Douglas Hamdorf
 Pauline Marion Harrow
 John Malcolm
 Roger Stewart Martin
 Stewart Wesley Potter, 
 John Stephen Rarcliffe
 Richard John Uden

Awardees are several members of the public who went to the rescue of several people caught in a rip at Yeppoon, Queensland on 13 April 2012.
 Matthew Leslie Danes
 Jake Robert Gunston
 Shane Andrew Hagarty
 Michael David Higginson
 Alex John Sainsbuty
 Kylie Sheree Smith

Awardees are members of the public who went to the rescue of several people who were in difficulty in rough surf at Marcoola Beach, Queensland on 23 January 2013.
 Damon Scott Bell, Victoria
 Blake Edward Cole

Awardees are members of the public who went to the rescue of a man trapped in a submerged crane at Habana, Queensland on 10 May 2013.
 Kathleen Margaret Allen
 Peter John Price
 Andrew James Rosier
 John Steven Teske
 Micheal Shane Wallace

Awardees are members of the public who went to the rescue of a colleague trapped in flood water at Marlborough, Queensland on 2 March 2011.
 Russell James Charleston
 Gavin Wayne Fox

Awardees are several people who worked as a paramedic rescue team during the Beaconsfield mine rescue in Tasmania on 25 April 2006.
 Jude May Barnes
 Nicholas William Chapman
 Matthew James Eastham
 Gregory Edsall, 
 Paul John Featherstone, 
 Ian Robert Hart
 Peter Warren James
 Graeme Robert Jones, 
 Dr Richard Walter Morris, 
 Daryl James Pendery
 Karen Pendery

Awardees are several people who worked as a low-intensity mine rescue team during the Beaconsfield mine rescue in Tasmania on 25 April 2006.
 Brett Henry Chalmers †
 Darren Thomas Flanghan, New South Wales
 Scott Franklin, Western Australia
 Jeremy Matthew Rowlings, New South Wales

The following awardees are added to the Group Bravery Citation awarded and gazetted on 19 March 2012.

Awardees are members of the public who went to the rescue of two girls who were trapped inside a burning house at Kelso, New South Wales on 22 July 2010.
 Kristie Clayton, New South Wales
 Amos John Mills, Queensland

References

Orders, decorations, and medals of Australia
2014 awards